Paolo Longo (born 3 November 1977) is an Italian biathlete. He competed at the 2002 Winter Olympics and the 2006 Winter Olympics.

References

External links
 

1977 births
Living people
Italian male biathletes
Olympic biathletes of Italy
Biathletes at the 2002 Winter Olympics
Biathletes at the 2006 Winter Olympics
People from Cavalese
Sportspeople from Trentino